Moore's Knob is the highest mountain in the Sauratown Mountains of Stokes County, North Carolina. The Sauratown Mountains are an isolated remnant of the much larger Blue Ridge Mountains far to the west and north. A rugged, deeply eroded range, the Sauras feature dramatic rock cliffs which can be seen for miles.

The top of the mountain contains an abandoned fire lookout tower; hikers who climb the tower are rewarded with sweeping views of the surrounding countryside and Sauratown mountain range. The Greensboro skyline is visible even at 40 miles away to the east. Moore's Knob is contained within Hanging Rock State Park, and the park maintains a number of hiking and climbing trails on the mountain.

Mountains of North Carolina
Protected areas of Stokes County, North Carolina
Inselbergs of Piedmont (United States)
Landforms of Stokes County, North Carolina